Taste of Texas is a steakhouse in Houston, in the U.S. state of Texas. The restaurant is among the top independent steakhouses in the United States and the nation's largest user of certified angus beef, as of 2018. Thrillist has described Taste of Texas as a "casual, family-friendly favorite". The restaurant also serves as a museum and has a collection of artifacts related to Texas history. Taste of Texas underwent a major renovation in 2018.

The restaurant had approximately 200 employees, as of 2020. During the COVID-19 pandemic, Taste of Texas offered delivery service and toilet paper with orders.

See also

 List of steakhouses

References

External links
 
 
 Taste of Texas at Lonely Planet
 Taste of Texas at Zagat
 Taste of Texas at Zomato

Restaurants in Houston
Steakhouses in the United States